Ferenc Babati (born 6 June 1972 in Zalaegerszeg) is a retired Hungarian football (midfielder) player who has spent most of his career playing for Zalaegerszegi TE.

External links
Player profile at HLSZ 

1972 births
Living people
People from Zalaegerszeg
Hungarian footballers
Association football midfielders
Paksi FC players
Újpest FC players
Zalaegerszegi TE players
Hévíz FC footballers
Szombathelyi Haladás footballers
Sportspeople from Zala County